Harleyford Golf Club is a golf club, located in Marlow, Buckinghamshire, England. It is located about 2 miles southwest of Marlow on a country estate near Harleyford Manor which dates back to the 13th century. It was established in 1996. The course was designed by Donald Steel.

There are views from Harleyford of the Thames Valley. Its geology provides Harleyford with good drainage, so it rarely closes due to bad weather. Even in the severe storms of 2003 and 2014 it was open for play when all other local golf courses closed for long periods.

References

Golf clubs and courses in Buckinghamshire
1996 establishments in England